Six Flags Great America is a  amusement park located in Gurnee, Illinois, within the northern Chicago metropolitan area. The amusement park originally opened as Marriott's Great America on May 29, 1976, as one of two theme parks built by the Marriott Corporation. Six Flags acquired the amusement park in 1984 after the theme park division was an earnings disappointment for Marriott. The sale gave Six Flags rights to the Looney Tunes intellectual properties.

In 1972, the Marriott Corporation bought rural land near the Tri-State Tollway and had officially announced the theme park to the public the following year, in 1973. The new park would be built near identical to its sister park in Santa Clara, California, now named California's Great America. Designed by architect Randall Duell, the park was designed in a "Duell loop," in where the park was laid out in a full circuit circularly, as employees worked out of sight, in the middle of the park. Opening attractions and areas within the park were designed to be based around areas around North America, such as Orleans Place, a neighborhood located in the French Quarter during the 1850s and Hometown Square, a 20th century American town. This has since expanded to twelve themed areas, such as the Wild West themed area Southwest Territory, three kids areas, with the County Fair subsection, Kidzopolis and two DC Comics themed areas, one being DC Universe.

Featuring 15 roller coasters, the park ranks fourth-most roller coasters in the world, tied with Cedar Point. Additionally, the park features an adjacent  water park called Hurricane Harbor Chicago, which features 25 water slides and attractions and opened on May 28, 2005. Since 2017, over 3 million guests visited Six Flags Great America, ranking it among the top 20 amusement parks in North America for attendance. Running from April until November, the park features multiple annual events such as the Halloween events Fright Fest and Kids Boo Fest, and formerly hosted the Christmas event Holiday in the Park, which had extended the park's operating season until January.

The park has achieved multiple milestones, records, and awards. American Eagle was one of the first record breakers for the park, becoming the tallest, fastest and longest racing wooden coaster in the world, a record that the ride still maintains. Batman: The Ride, the park's inverted roller coaster, was the first of its kind, and was awarded the American Coaster Enthusiasts (ACE) Landmark award in 2005. Whizzer also won the same award in 2012 for the park's maintenance of the attraction. Shows at the park have also received critical acclaim, with recognition from the International Association of Amusement Parks and Attractions (IAAPA), winning "Best Overall Production" awards.

History

1970–1984: Operation under Marriott

Development and construction 
In the early 1970s, the Marriott Corporation, owner of several restaurant chains and Marriott hotels, sought to branch further out into the tourism and vacation industry. The largest of the projects it took on was a chain of state-of-the-art theme parks, each of which would be named "Marriott's Great America" and themed around American history, opening in time for the nation's bicentennial. From the beginning, three parks were planned, as Marriott identified three underserved metropolitan areas that could support a major amusement park: Baltimore–Washington, the San Francisco Bay Area, and Chicago-Milwaukee.

The largest of these, at 850 acres, was announced for Laurel, Maryland, in 1972. The proposal was canceled after fierce opposition from local residents convinced officials to deny the park permits, and the plans were moved to Manassas, Virginia, in 1973, where it faced even stronger opposition from local residents and the National Park Service. The planned opening of the flagship park was delayed repeatedly until Marriott abandoned the idea late in the decade.

Meanwhile, the plans for the other two parks proceeded more smoothly. The location in the north of the Chicago metropolitan area was chosen to bring in visitors from Milwaukee and Chicago. Marriott purchased 600 acres of rural land in Gurnee straddling the Tri-State Tollway in August 1972, causing speculation in the Chicago Tribune that an amusement park was planned for the site. The Gurnee park was officially announced on January 29, 1973, along with a hotel and an industrial park. Marriott received approval from local authorities, but the Illinois State Toll Highway Authority would not approve a proposal for an interchange on the tollway leading directly into the parking lot.

The groundbreaking ceremony was held on Flag Day, June 14, 1974. Randall Duell was the leader of the design team for the park, who created two nearly identical plans for the Gurnee park and the sister park in Santa Clara, California. Duell was a veteran theme park designer and for the Great America parks he sought to create his greatest design yet. With an overarching Americana theme in mind, Marriott's designers traveled across the country, observing styles and collecting artifacts to help inform an authentic atmosphere.

The park was broken up into six original themed areas, which are organized in a "Duell loop" that runs clockwise around the perimeter. The first of these was Carousel Plaza, located at the front of the park, centered around the double-decker Columbia Carousel, Hometown Square, and based on early 20th century small towns of the Midwest; followed by The Great Midwest Livestock Exposition at County Fair (now just County Fair), with its early 20th century rural county fair; Yukon Territory, resembling a logging camp in the Canadian Yukon; Yankee Harbor, a 19th-century New England port inspired by Cape Cod; and finally Orleans Place, modeled after the French Quarter of New Orleans.

Each themed area had its own set of costumes for park employees, and the design of buildings, shops and restaurants were all unique to each theme. For example, the Klondike Cafe in Yukon Territory served beef dishes in large pans like those used for panning for gold. A seventh area, The Great Southwest, was planned from the beginning as a potential expansion, but was not built until 1996, when it opened as Southwest Territory.

Opening and operation 

The park opened on Saturday, May 29, 1976, two months after California's Great America. The park was an immediate success due in part to coinciding with the bicentennial. From the beginning, the park made use of the Looney Tunes characters as costumed figures to interact with the park attendees, a tradition that continues today under Six Flags ownership. At its opening in 1976, Great America featured three roller coasters, Willard's Whizzer, Turn of the Century and The Gulf Coaster. The park had also included other flat rides throughout the park. These attractions included the elaborate double-decker Columbia Carousel, which opened as one of the tallest carousels in the world and the Sky Whirl, a unique, -tall "triple ferris wheel" custom-designed for Marriott. Transportation rides included Delta Flyer and Eagle's Flight, two one-way gondola sky car rides. In Orleans Place, attractions in the area were Orleans Orbit, (later renamed simply the "Orbit"), an Enterprise-type ride and Rue Le Dodge, a bumper car ride.
The park's second season in 1977 saw the installation of several new rides. The  Sky Trek Tower opened in Carousel Plaza and today is one of the few rides to still operate under its original name. Sky Trek Tower was built as and still remains, the tallest freestanding structure in Lake County, Illinois. Also added was Southern Cross, a third gondola sky car ride which offered a round trip and a much higher view than the other two, whose station replaced the removed Gulf Coaster. A few new spinning rides were added, such as Big Top, Davy Jones' Dinghies and Hay Baler. The park's first children's section, dubbed Fort Fun, opened in the section designated the Yukon Territory in 1978, which caused the Saskatchewan Scrambler to be relocated to Hometown Square and renamed Hometown Fun Machine. Additionally, Great America's fourth roller coaster, Tidal Wave, was a Schwarzkopf Shuttle Loop that opened in 1978 in Yankee Harbor. The Pictorium, an IMAX theatre, opened in 1979 and claimed to have the world's largest screen, at 64.5 by 88.25 feet (19.6 × 26.9 meters).

The Turn of the Century roller coaster closed and took on a new look in 1980. Two vertical loops were added, along with two tunnels and the "new" ride was re-themed and renamed Demon. The ride featured an original theme song and new hellish theme elements, some of which were removed following a backlash from those who thought that the ride's theming was too "demonic". The American Eagle, a racing wooden roller coaster, opened in 1981. When the American Eagle first opened, it had the longest drop and fastest speeds of any wooden roller coaster in the world. It remains the tallest, fastest and longest twin racing wooden coaster.

The Picnic Grove was added in 1982, allowing for more company outings and corporate events to take place at the growing theme park. No new rides were added that year, and several small rides were removed in the last years of Marriott ownership. Southern Cross was removed in 1983. That same year, The Edge, an Intamin first-generation freefall ride, was added to much fanfare. Bottoms Up, a Chance Trabant ride and Traffique Jam were removed at the end of the 1983 season.

The last ride Marriott added to the park was White Water Rampage in 1983, an Intamin-built rapids ride that was later renamed Roaring Rapids and remains the park's most popular water ride. The ride was added to Orleans Place, which required the removal of small rides such as Traffique Jam. The Orleans Orbit was moved from its original Orleans Place location to Hometown Square, and became simply The Orbit. By the mid-1980s, the Marriott Corporation was disappointed with the financial performance of its theme park division, with lower profits than the company expected, in part because the third and largest of its Great America parks was never realized. As a result, Marriott decided to focus on its core businesses and began searching for buyers for its two amusement parks. While California's Great America was sold to the city of Santa Clara, Bally Manufacturing, then the parent company of the Six Flags Corporation, offered to purchase the Gurnee park for $114.5 million. The deal was finalized on April 26, 1984, and as a result Six Flags also acquired the right to use the Looney Tunes characters at all of its other parks.

1984–1990: Acquisition by Six Flags

After the sale of the park to Bally Manufacturing in 1983, Great America officially became a Six Flags park. For the upcoming 1984 season, the park was re-branded as Six Flags Great America. Regarding the acquisition of the park, Bally CEO Robert Mullane stated that it would be "foolish to change anything major" at the park. Less than a month after the purchase, a software failure caused a car on The Edge, a freefall ride, to be stalled at the top of the lift shaft before moving forward into its drop position. The car was stuck in this position for a short period of time before it dropped in the lift shaft, causing injuries to all three occupants. Despite many attempts to reopen The Edge with installation of anti-rollback devices by Intamin, the ride was never able to escape the stigma of its 1984 accident. The ride was removed in 1986.

In 1985, Six Flags added Z-Force to the County Fair area, a one-of-a-kind Intamin space diver roller coaster that closed in 1987 and was the only one ever manufactured. The site was later used for Iron Wolf, which opened in 1990. Z Force was relocated to Six Flags Over Georgia as part of Six Flags' (now discontinued) Ride Rotation Program. At the end of 1991, the ride went to Six Flags Magic Mountain, where it operated as Flashback before closing in 2003, and being demolished in 2007. Power Dive was added in 1987 to take over the spot where The Edge had stood. Power Dive was an Intamin Looping Starship ride; it swung back and forth before eventually rotating a complete 360 degrees a few times.

While operating the Six Flags chain, Bally found that the excess resources demanded and high seasonal fluctuations of the theme park business made it an unnecessary burden on its core interests. In 1987, Bally sold Six Flags to Wesray Capital Corporation and a group of Six Flags managers. Several acquisitions were re-sold or closed, while Wesray moved the company's focus from theming to major attractions. This ushered in an era of major new rides and roller coasters at Six Flags parks like Great America.

1988 saw the first of the new coasters, with the addition of the massive roller coaster Shock Wave, an Arrow Dynamics mega-looper, opening in Orleans Place section of the park on June 3. Shock Wave was the world's tallest roller coaster at the time it opened and was surpassed the following year by Cedar Point's Magnum XL-200. It also featured a record seven inversions, which was surpassed in 1995 by PortAventura Park's Dragon Khan. When Six Flags Great Adventure's Sarajevo Bobsled, an Intamin Bobsled roller coaster, closed in 1988, it was moved to Great America and became Rolling Thunder in 1989, also as part of the Ride Rotation Program. It was added between Demon and Whizzer, where it operated until 1996. It now operates as Alpine Bobsled at The Great Escape.

For 1990, Bolliger & Mabillard constructed their first ever roller coaster with Iron Wolf, a compact steel stand-up coaster, opened on Z-Force's former spot in County Fair. The Condor was added to Orleans Place in 1991, next to Shock Wave. During the same year, the IMAX screen in the Pictorium was upgraded to allow 3D movies to be shown and fans said goodbye to Tidal Wave at the end of the season. It was relocated to Six Flags Over Georgia where it operated as Viper from 1995 to 2001, then to Kentucky Kingdom as Greezed Lightnin' from 2003 to 2009.

1990s: Transition into thrill park 
By 1990, Six Flags was on the verge of bankruptcy. Time Warner, which had held a major influence at Great America since the beginning through the licensing of its Looney Tunes characters, was a minority owner in the company and it purchased an additional share of the company for a controlling interest of 50 percent. The entrance of the entertainment and communications conglomerate gave the company not only a much-needed influx of new capital, but a chance for increased usage of Time Warner properties in Six Flags parks.

The first of these collaborations between Six Flags and Time Warner came in 1992, as Bolliger & Mabillard constructed their first inverted roller coaster, Batman: The Ride, to replace Tidal Wave. Batman was unlike any other roller coaster at the time, as it opened as one of the first inverted roller coasters and took riders through five inversions. It was a tight fit for Yankee Harbor, but it proved so popular that lines stretched out of the ride area and across large parts of the park. The surrounding area of Yankee Harbor was re-themed after the Batman films, with The Lobster being renamed the East River Crawler, which had retained the name before it was moved to Hometown Square under its original name in 2016. Batman: The Ride was awarded landmark status by the American Coaster Enthusiasts (ACE) at their annual convention in 2005.

To add to the hype around Batman from the opening of Batman: The Ride and the mega-hit film Batman Returns, the Batman Stunt Show opened in 1993 in a brand-new amphitheater located past Demon; which would later come to be known as the Southwest Territory Amphitheater. Six Flags and Time Warner had debuted The Batman Stunt Show at Six Flags Great Adventure the year prior, with great success. The theater would be a popular venue with several stunt shows for years to come, before being torn down for the 2016 addition of the Justice League: Battle for Metropolis dark ride.
Space Shuttle America, a motion simulator ride, was built in 1994 near Sky Trek Tower. In addition to its purpose-made titular film, Space Shuttle America was home to three other shows during its lifetime: Escape from Dino Island 2 - 3:D, Stargate - SG:3000, and Superstition during the yearly Fright Fest Event. The original Space Shuttle America film returned for the 2006 season. In 2009, both the Space Shuttle America building and Space Shuttle themed facade have been removed.

In 1995, construction began on a new themed area for the park. The Southwest Territory was originally intended to be added to the park in 1979, with the Southern Cross ride intended to bring guests to it. The first ride built for the new area was Viper, a wooden roller coaster based on the Coney Island Cyclone and themed after a snake oil salesman. Although smaller in stature than American Eagle, this twister-style coaster features many more instances of airtime during the ride. It was built next to Rolling Thunder, which was removed later the same year to make room for the new area. The ride was relocated to The Great Escape in New York, where it continues to operate as Alpine Bobsled.

Southwest Territory opened in 1996, with a desert theme based on the Old West. Three new rides were added: River Rocker, a pirate ship ride; Chubasco, a teacup ride; and Trail Blazer, a Zamperla Joker. The Big Top was moved in from County Fair and renamed Ricochet. Viper's entrance, which had previously been located in Hometown Square, was moved to Southwest Territory entrance. To add to the excitement surrounding the new area, the amphitheater that has previously been home to the Batman Stunt Show was named the "Southwest Territory Amphitheater", and an all-new show, the Warner Bros. Western Stunt Show, debuted. This show followed the misadventures of three outlaws as they tangled with characters from Western films such as Maverick, Blazing Saddles and F Troop. The Western Stunt Show ran for three seasons and was replaced in 1999 by the Butch Cassidy and the Sundance Kid Stunt Show. Giant Drop, an Intamin second-generation drop tower and Dare Devil Dive, a skycoaster, were added in 1997. Giant Drop was placed on the southwest side of Southwest Territory across from the mission, and was themed to be an ore excavator in the fictional Loco Diablo Mine. Dare Devil Dive opened in County Fair.

Time Warner sold 50% of its stake in Six Flags in 1995, and in 1998, Premier Parks had its IPO and became the parent company of Six Flags Theme Parks after purchasing the remaining stake from Time Warner as well as the other 50% that had previously been sold off to holding companies. Premier Parks opted to follow the trend set by Bally's and began acquiring more properties. Plans for expansion outside the amusement park started in the fall of 1997 with the planning of Six Flags Entertainment Village, an entertainment complex that would've been located across Interstate 94.

1998 saw many family-friendly additions. Yukon Territory welcomed Camp Cartoon Network, with five new rides, including Spacely's Sprocket Rockets (a Vekoma junior roller coaster), Scooby-Doos Mystery Machine, Yogi's Yahoo River, Rocky Road's Rescue Service and Bedrock Boulder Roller. Bugs Bunny Land was renamed Looney Tunes National Park and included the Looney Tooter Choo Choo Train, the Waddaview Charter, Porky's Buzzy Beez, Petunia's Lady Bugz, Looney Tunes Lodge Foam Ball Factory, Pepe Le Pew's Peak and the Nature Trail. Opposition for Six Flags Entertainment Village arose in November 1998 with the citizens group Citizens United for a Residential Village of Gurnee (CURV) forming, with the concern of road congestion and rising tax prices.

Bolliger & Mabillard constructed Raging Bull in 1999, a hyper-twister coaster that was added to Southwest Territory. In late October, the park had officially cancelled their Entertainment Village project.

2000s: Rapid growth and expansion 
The park celebrated its silver (25th) season in 2000. This was the last year for the Sky Whirl, as well as the Hay Baler ride. Since the removal of Sky Whirl after the 2000 season, Six Flags Great America has continued to operate without a Ferris wheel. That same year, an accident involving a guest occurred on the Cajun Cliffhanger ride, which led to its eventual removal.

In 2001, two inverted shuttle coasters were added: an Intamin impulse coaster named Vertical Velocity, stylized as V2; and Déjà Vu, a Vekoma Giant Inverted Boomerang ride to replace Sky Whirl and Hay Baler. Vertical Velocity was added to Yankee Harbor, with the swing ride Whirligig moving closer to the lift hill of Batman: The Ride to make room.

At the beginning of the 2002 season, there were no major changes to the park. The Pictorium's original IMAX film, To Fly, was once again shown. In the summer, plans were announced to remove the Whizzer, which would offer its final rides on August 11. The announcement confirmed existing rumors. The plan to remove the coaster, which was one of only two operating Schwarzkopf Speedracers in the world, an original ride from the park's first season and a popular family-friendly attraction, was met with outrage from the public, particularly because the intended replacement was a major thrill ride. The backlash led to Six Flags deciding on August 3 to cancel their plans to replace Whizzer, and instead elected to replace Shockwave. Power Dive was also removed, due to maintenance problems.

In 2003, Bolliger & Mabillard constructed Superman: Ultimate Flight in Orleans Place, on the plot of land where Shock Wave stood. It was the Midwest's second flying roller coaster, the first being X-Flight at Geauga Lake. The layout of the ride is identical to versions of the ride at Six Flags Great Adventure and Six Flags Over Georgia. Shock Wave had partially stood in the parking lot and for Superman the entire landscaping of the ride area was redone. Additionally, the historic Ameri-Go-Round in County Fair was removed at the end of the 2003 season.

Mardi Gras, a new themed area and an extension of Orleans Place, was added in 2004. It was built in the area where Power Dive and Cajun Cliffhanger had stood. A spinning wild mouse coaster named Ragin' Cajun was added, along with a HUSS Top-Spin model named King Chaos, Zamperla Rockin' Tug named Jester's Wild Ride and a Zamperla Balloon Race named Big Easy Balloons. The same year, the removed Ameri-Go-Round from County Fair was replaced by Revolution, a HUSS Frisbee ride taken from Six Flags Great Adventure. On September 17, 2004, the Six Flags Hurricane Harbor water park was officially announced. It would become the seventh Hurricane Harbor water park to open, and would be built on a parking lot behind Raging Bull and Viper. The water park would feature Bahama Mama and Bubba Tubba, Hurricane Bay, a wave pool, among other attractions. Groundbreaking began in November 2004, with grand opening on May 28, 2005.

In December 2005, stockholders approved a plan offered by Daniel Snyder of Red Zone, LLC to take over management of Six Flags, Inc., following a fierce stockholder revolt due to rising financial concerns. Snyder appointed former ESPN executive Mark Shapiro as the new CEO of Six Flags, after Kieran Burke was ousted from the company. Snyder and Shapiro's plan of action was to move Six Flags away from Premier Parks' thrill-heavy focus and move more toward a family-friendly environment. During the 2006 season, Six Flags Great America celebrated its 30th anniversary. The classic Triple Play ride in Hometown Square was dismantled prior to the start of the season because Six Flags Over Texas had received a similar HUSS Troika that had been damaged during the hasty demolition of Six Flags AstroWorld, and so a part was needed from the Great America ride for the ride to operate. Triple Play returned for 2007.

Also in 2006, Six Flags announced it would replace its sign that sits along Interstate 94 during the off season. The sign, which had been standing since the park opened in 1976, was replaced with a smaller one featuring an LED screen. The new sign went up within a week after the old one was taken down in December 2006, and uses the old sign's post.

2007 marked the introduction of the electronic Flash Pass virtual queue system to Six Flags parks, including Great America. For an additional fee, guests can purchase a Flash Pass and wait in line for a ride without actually standing in line. The system, themed after the DC Comics character, replaced an existing punch card system that was used at the park.

As part of the new focus on entertainment, Six Flags introduced a new stunt show, Operation SpyGirl, in the Southwest Territory Amphitheater for the 2007 season. Operation SpyGirl was an original live-action production created by Joel Surnow, co-creator of the Fox television series 24. Operation SpyGirl debuted in May, and closed for the season in August. The show marked several new ventures for Six Flags, including pre-show entertainment in the waiting area, which set up the storyline that the evil archvillain Max Condor had stolen the "Super Viper Rocket" from the agency for which SpyGirl works—as well as a merchandise cart outside selling "SpyGirl" themed merchandise. Operation SpyGirl did not return in 2008. Other new shows introduced for the 2007 season were "Spirit of America" at the reflection pond in front of the Columbia Carousel, and "Show Stoppin'" in the Grand Music Hall.

The tented area in front of the American Eagle was converted into Wiggles World in 2007, a third children's area themed after the Wiggles. Wiggles World featured five new rides, Henry's Splash Fountain, the USS Feathersword Play Area, the Yummy Yummy Cafe and the Get Ready to Wiggle Stage show. American Eagle's entrance was relocated to the right of the tent, utilizing part of the entrance building for the adjacent Dare Devil Dive skycoaster, to accommodate the Wiggles area.

Great America added The Dark Knight Coaster in 2008, an indoor Mack wild mouse roller coaster themed after the film and located in Orleans Place. The ride is located indoors, mostly in the dark, and has a storyline based around Batman and The Joker. The Theater Royale was converted into a queue building for the ride, which features a preshow starring Aaron Eckhart, reprising his role as Harvey Dent from the film. Additionally, Splashwater Falls closed for the 2007 season early on, and was removed in March 2008. For 2009, Six Flags replaced Déjà Vu with Buccaneer Battle, a pirate-themed boat ride in County Fair designed by Mack Rides. During the ride, there are numerous interactive water elements that can be controlled by passersby.

2010–2020: Breaking records  
Six Flags officially emerged from bankruptcy protection on May 3, 2010, and announced plans to issue new stock on the New York Stock Exchange. Amid suspected disagreements regarding the future of the company with the board, Shapiro left the company and Al Weber, Jr. was brought in as interim president and CEO. Six Flags announced that Jim Reid-Anderson would replace Weber and become chairman, president, and CEO on August 13, 2010. In 2010, Great America acquired the Little Dipper, a "kiddie" wooden roller coaster that had previously operated at Kiddieland Amusement Park in Melrose Park, a western suburb of Chicago, from 1950 until 2009. It was placed outside Bugs Bunny National Park and opened to the public on May 27, 2010. The park also introduced the Glow in the Park Parade, which was already featured at other Six Flags parks, and MagiQuest was added to the County Fair Games Gallery in place of the Wii Experience.

Space Shuttle America, the park's motion simulator ride that had been closed for two years, was removed during the 2010 season. On May 26, 2010, Great America filed a petition with the Village of Gurnee seeking to exceed the village's  height limit. Six Flags was considering installing Chang, a roller coaster moved after the closure of Kentucky Kingdom, in place of the shuttle. However, the park confirmed it was abandoning those plans in July 2010 and that the space would instead be used for Riptide Bay, a  addition to the Hurricane Harbor water park.

In late 2010, Six Flags began removing some licensed properties from concessions and attractions, with Wiggles World being renamed Kidzopolis and having Wiggles branding and theming removed for 2011. MagiQuest closed due to a lack of popularity and Great America Raceway, an original ride from 1976, was closed and removed. At the end of the 2011 season, Iron Wolf was closed and removed. It was relocated to Six Flags America, rebranded as Apocalypse, before it was converted into a floorless roller coaster and renamed Firebird in the 2019 season. For 2012, the former sites of Splashwater Falls and the Great America Raceway in County Fair were taken over by a new wing coaster from Bolliger & Mabillard with 5 inversions, a 12-story drop and speeds of up to 55 mph. When X-Flight was the second roller coaster of its type in North America and the fourth in the world.

The Glow in the Park parade was replaced in 2013 with IgNight — Grand Finale to the park. IgNight was held in Hometown Square, in front of the Hometown Station. Six Flags announced that 2013 would be the "Season of Backwards" at Great America, with Batman: The Ride, Viper and the Blue Train on American Eagle all running backwards for some part of the season. At the end of the season, Ragin' Cajun closed and was relocated to Six Flags America in 2014. For 2014, the park received Goliath, a  wooden roller coaster built by Rocky Mountain Construction. The ride broke world records for the steepest drop, fastest speed and longest drop on a wooden coaster, and was built on the plot of land where Iron Wolf formerly stood. Three former kiddie rides were reinstalled in the all-new Hometown Park children's area in 2015, located in Hometown Square. That year, the park held the "40 Seasons of Thrills" celebration, a festival which celebrated the park's history.

In 2016, Great America introduced Justice League: Battle for Metropolis, a 4D interactive dark ride, alongside a new themed area: Metropolis Plaza. The area is themed after the city of Metropolis from DC Comics, and is located between Southwest Territory and County Fair. Six Flags also announced plans to add virtual reality headsets to Raging Bull by the end of that season, but Demon received the VR headsets instead, creating a new 'Rage of the Gargoyles' ride experience. The Orbit, an original 1976 attraction, closed on August 6, 2016. At the end of the season, The Jester's Wild Ride was also removed.

The Joker, an S&S 4D Free Spin roller coaster, was added to Yankee Harbor for the 2017 season. The park also announced that The Orbit would not return, and East River Crawler was relocated to the former site of The Orbit and its name returned to The Lobster, the original name for the ride. For the first month of the season, VR headsets were added to Giant Drop, which became the "Drop of Doom".

Mardi Gras Hangover, a fire ball attraction, was added in 2018. The attraction is a 100 foot tall looping flat ride which at the time was the largest of its kind in the world. King Chaos closed on August 26, 2017, to make way for the new ride. On April 11, Six Flags Great America announced that Holiday in the Park would also debut at the park November 23, 2018. On April 27, the park confirmed via their official Twitter account that Pictorium would be demolished to make way for new thrills. The Pictorium was mainly used for a hypnotist show during Fright Fest and also hosted the "Screams and Dreams" series about the park's history. On August 30, 2018, the park announced that Maxx Force would open in 2019 replacing the Pictorium. It is manufactured by S&S Worldwide, and is an air launch roller coaster that breaks three world records and features the fastest acceleration in North America. On October 9, 2018, the Rockford Park District announced a potential lease agreement with Six Flags Great America for the park to operate Magic Waters (now Six Flags Hurricane Harbor Rockford). On December 11, 2018, the lease deal was made official and Six Flags took control of the water park on April 1, 2019.

2020–present: Transformation into family park 

In March 2020, the park announced the delay of the opening for the 2020 season due to the COVID-19 pandemic, and was ordered to stay closed until the "Phase 5" of Illinois' phased re-opening plan. The attached water park re-opened to the public on July 20, 2020, with safety protocols in place, using the name Hurricane Harbor Chicago. Although the full re-opening of the park was deemed "unlikely" by the Lake County Health Department, the park did open with Holiday in the Park Lights, a holiday lights event, along with Holiday in the Park Lights Drive-Thru, a drive-through holiday event.

On March 22, 2021, the connected Hurricane Harbor park, now officially named Hurricane Harbor Chicago, was announced to become the 27th park in the Six Flags chain, becoming a separate park. In the following month on April 24, 2021, the park reopened at 25% capacity under Illinois order, with safety protocols in place, including a reservation system, mask mandates, social distancing, and thermal imaging for temperature checks. On May 13, 2021, Illinois state governor J. B. Pritzker, with the park, announced that they would be giving away 50,000 admission tickets; an estimated total value of $4,000,000, for Illinois residents that have been newly vaccinated with the COVID-19 vaccine. Expanded capacity started on May 14, 2021 with 60% capacity afterwards as part of the "Bridge" reopening plan. The park opened at full capacity on June 11, 2021, and all mask mandates were dropped.On March 24, 2022, the park announced DC Universe, a DC Comics themed area. The area is a re-theme of Yankee Harbor. It would feature 3 "re-imagined" rides, The Flash: Vertical Velocity, a re-theme of Vertical Velocity, DC Super-Villains Swing, a re-theme of Whirligig and Aquaman Splashdown, a re-theme of Yankee Clipper. Opening day of DC Universe was slated for April 15, 2022, when the park opened, but due to "excessive rain and supply chain issues," the area would open later in spring. DC Universe opened on April 23, 2022.

Additionally, in 2022, the stunt show Kinetic premiered on June 25, 2022, and ended on August 7, 2022, in the Grand Music Hall. Running for 30 minutes in total, Kinetic is set in an urbanized-skate park setting and was produced and directed by entertainment manager David Major. The park had cast both local talent and entertainers from a New York entertainment group. Stunts during the show included BMX, kick scooter and trampoline acts. Along with the stunts, Kinetic also featured song and dance performances and featured multiple instances of audience interaction. Kinetic was in development since 2020, being the first summer production at the park since 2019.

Areas and attractions

The overall layout of Six Flags Great America has remained mostly unchanged from the original design that was created for Marriott. The park's designer, Randall Duell, followed the pattern of his trademark "Duell loop", creating a series of themed areas around a path which winds around the park circularly, allowing space for employees and maintenance workers to work out of sight of guests in the middle.

When the park opened in 1976, it had five original areas:

 Hometown Square, which resembled an American town in the 1920s.
 The Great Midwest Livestock Exposition and County Fair, which represented a county fair in the 20th century.
 Yukon Territory, representing the Klondike Gold Rush.
 Yankee Harbor, representing a New England harbor.
 Orleans Place, which represented New Orleans in the 1850s.

Six Flags Great America, in total, features twelve themed areas. From the park's main entrance, entering into Carousel Plaza; proceeding counterclockwise, the themed areas are:

 Carousel Plaza, the entrance plaza to Six Flags Great America.
 Hometown Square, representing an American town.
 Hometown Park, a small kids area within Hometown Square featuring three original rides opening in 2015, placed near its former spot in 1976.
 County Fair, originally The Great Midwest Livestock Exposition and County Fair, now shortened to County Fair.
 Kidzopolis, a themed area for kids (formerly Wiggles World from 2007 to 2010).
 Southwest Territory, a themed area representing a Wild West town opening in 1996 (a portion was cut off into Metropolis Plaza).
 Metropolis Plaza, a DC Comics themed mini-area representing the fictional DC Comics city Metropolis, which holds Justice League: Battle for Metropolis (formerly Southwest Territory Amphitheater).
 Yukon Territory, representing the Klondike Gold Rush.
 Camp Cartoon, a cartoon-themed area for kids (formerly Camp Cartoon Network from 1990s to 2018).
 DC Universe, a DC Comics themed area (formerly Yankee Harbor from 1976 to 2021).
 Mardi Gras, formerly a section from Orleans Place, the area is themed to the Mardi Gras holiday.
 Orleans Place, a Southern themed area closely based on the French Quarter (part of the section was broken into Mardi Gras).

Carousel Plaza
The front entrance area to the park. In addition to the rides, there are shops and food kiosks themed to the area.

Orleans Place

Orleans Place is themed around New Orleans in the late 1800s, specifically the historic French Quarter. The area opened as an original area in 1976, and part of the area was later divided into Mardi Gras in 2004, connecting thematically to the area.

Rue Le Dodge is the last original ride from 1976 in the themed area. Other original attractions from the parks' opening placed in the area were removed, such as Gulf Coaster, a kids coaster placed in the area which is now occupied by Mardi Gras, which closed in 1977 due to multiple fires which plagued the ride.

Some other removed attractions would also include The Edge, which was removed in 1986, Traffique Jam and Orleans Orbit, which were both removed to make way for White Water Rampage. The latter was later moved to Hometown Square, before its removal in 2016 to make way for The Lobster, an original ride from Yankee Harbor.

Mardi Gras

One of the park's newest themed areas, it opened in 2004, after being converted from part of Orleans Place. The area's theme comes from the Mardi Gras holiday and specifically the famous celebration of the holiday in New Orleans.

When Mardi Gras opened, it featured four rides, Big Easy Balloons, a Zamperla "Balloon Race" attraction, King Chaos, a top spin attraction, Jester's Wild Ride, a "Rockin' Tug" attraction, and Roaring Rapids, an Intamin river rapids ride which originally opened in Orleans Place in 1983.

Changes for the area started in 2016 when the park announced The Joker. The original covered bridge used for entry to the former Yankee Harbor was moved to make way for the new attraction. Additionally, Jester's Wild Ride was also removed for the attraction. The next change came the following year, in 2017, when King Chaos was announced to be closed to build Mardi Gras Hangover, an attraction in which is the tallest Larson Loop in the world, although the park claims it is the tallest "loop coaster."

DC Universe

DC Universe opened as Yankee Harbor in 1976, a 19th-century New England themed town, closely based on Cape Cod. Yankee Harbor, throughout the year, had changed more than the other original themed areas, with the removal of multiple original attractions, and a focus on more DC Comics themed rides.

The area changed in 2022, when it became DC Universe, a DC Comics themed area. The area re-used attraction names from other Six Flags parks for the re-theme of some of the original non-DC themed rides.

Yukon Territory

This area is themed around the famous forests and mountains in northwest Canada, with references to logging, prospecting and gold panning, specifically the Klondike Gold Rush.

Yukon Territory formerly held Bugs Bunny National Park that opened in 1998, but was fully replaced with Winner's Circle Go Karts, an upcharge attraction, in 2012. Many buildings in the area that originally opened are now closed, and most props in the area have been removed.

Camp Cartoon

This is a sub-section of Yukon Territory. It was known as Camp Cartoon Network when first added in 1998. Despite the former name, the rides were themed to Hanna-Barbera properties and not Cartoon Network ones.

Metropolis Plaza
The smallest themed area of the park, based on DC Comics characters. It replaced the Southwest Amphitheater in 2016.

County Fair

The Great Midwest Livestock Exposition at County Fair, almost always known simply as County Fair, is an original themed area located in back of the park, and is the largest themed area. There are many shops, stalls and attractions set in a theme based on a rural county fair. The area also features a food court and a gallery of carnival games.

Some former attractions located in County Fair includes Ameri-Go-Round, a smaller carousel which was replaced with Revolution in 2003, Barney Oldfield Speedway, a car attraction named after American racer Barney Oldfield, which was later replaced with X-Flight, and the Sky Whirl, which was a triple-arm ferris wheel, which was removed to make way for Déjà Vu.

Kidzopolis

A children's-specific area of County Fair, located in front of the American Eagle entrance tent. Originally known as Wiggles World, the area was added for 2007. The Wiggles theming was removed after the 2010 season.

Hometown Square

One of the park's original areas, themed after a small midwestern town around the turn of the century. Guests walk through many shops and stalls and can ride many classic carnival-style rides.

Whizzer, a Schwarzkopf spiral-lift coaster, is one of the last of its kind in the world. Hometown Square includes two show venues - the Grand Music Hall, an indoor theater, which at the park's opening, featured 1,600 seats, and the Hometown Square Stage, a stage on the Scenic Railway Station.

Attractions that once stood in Hometown Square includes Bottoms Up, a Chance Rides trabant ride which was an original ride near Demon before it was removed in 1983, and The Orbit. The Orbit was a Schwarzkopf enterprise ride which was also an original ride, originally in Orleans Place, before it was moved into Hometown Square, replacing Bottoms Up. The Orbit was removed in 2016 to make way for The Lobster, which was being moved from Yankee Harbor to make way for The Joker.

Hometown Park
This area is a sub-section of Hometown Square. This section previously existed from the park's opening in 1976 until the rides were removed after the 2001 season. In 2015, three of the original rides returned as part of the park's 40th season celebration.

Southwest Territory

Originally intended to be built in 1979 as The Great Southwest, the area, themed around an old Wild West town, was built in 1996. The area is outside of the park's loop, connected to both Hometown Square and County Fair. It also had the primary connection to Hurricane Harbor Chicago prior to the parks separating admission.

Hurricane Harbor Chicago

Six Flags Hurricane Harbor Chicago is a  water park located adjacent to Six Flags Great America that originally opened in 2005 under the Six Flags Hurricane Harbor naming. The water park features 25 water slides and attractions throughout the water park. On March 22, 2021, the water park was announced to be separately gated from the amusement park.

Annual events

Fright Fest 

On weekends in September and October, Six Flags Great America features its annual Halloween event "Fright Fest". The event started small in the early nineties and has expanded significantly since then. During the event the park is decorated into several different "Scare Zones" featuring haunted houses, frightening street characters, Halloween themed shows, as well as transformed rides. Fright Fest features haunted houses, which are usually an additional fee. Some haunted houses include "Condemned," a haunted house introduced in 2021, based on an underground laboratory and "Bloodshed," which is based on an evil lumberjack. Some other haunted houses include Big Top Terror, Gates of Hell, the 13th Order and Manslaughter Manor. Many of the park's rides receive special theming and operate differently than usual. Chubasco, the park's teacup ride, is transformed into Terror Twister 2: A Turn for the Worse, in which the ride building is enclosed and a custom lighting design matched with a custom club style music mix is played. Condor, one of the park's flat rides, is renamed during the event as The Birds and The Pit and runs a different cycle.

Fright Fest also features shows and performances throughout the park. Love at First Fright has been presented in the Grand Music Hall every year since the event's inception and follows the story of a couple on a dare to spend the night in a cemetery who get caught up in crazy antics when several classic Halloween creatures rise from the grave. The show often plays to capacity audiences during the event, and it is known for changing the show each year to include various pop culture and newsworthy references. The show has won multiple awards from the International Association of Amusement Parks and Attractions for Best Overall Production. Another show, The Ringmaster's Cabaret, is described as a "freak show" which mixes in illusions with singing and dancing, and is also presented at the Grand Music Hall. Past shows include Susan Rosan - a hypnotist who's with the event for many years until 2018, Mundaka, a show held in the former Theatre Royale and The Damsel and the Warlock, in the Snowshoe Saloon.  For several years a third party called JPM Productions provided street characters and haunted house actors for the event. While the company was praised for its costumes and makeup, in 2010 Six Flags moved the entire production in-house for greater creative control.

Holiday in the Park 

In 2015, Jim Reid-Anderson had teased the arrival of Holiday in the Park, a Christmas-oriented event. Anderson stated that Six Flags would "see if [Holiday in the Park] makes sense" at the park. A promotion for the announcement of Holiday in the Park started in April 2018, and was called the 4-1-1. On April 11, 2018, Six Flags Great America announced that it would stay open through the end of the year with an event called Holiday in the Park. The new event began on November 23, 2018, and ran weekends through December 23, 2018, and ran daily December 26 through December 31, 2018. Holiday in the Park was developed and produced by RWS Entertainment Group, creating multiple light shows throughout the park.
Starting for the 2020 season, Holiday in the Park Lights began as a replacement for the regular Holiday in the Park event. Due to Illinois' guidelines for the COVID-19 pandemic at that time, rides could not operate. In 2021, though, the park re-opened indoor venues and some attractions. In addition to Holiday in the Park Lights, Six Flags also ran the Holiday in the Park Drive-Thru for both the 2020 and 2021 season, operating weekdays, while the regular Holiday in the Park Lights event ran on weekends. The park removed Holiday in the Park from their event lineup for the 2022 season, and the park closed for the rest of winter.

Holiday in the Park featured multiple shows, one of which were A Wonderland at the Grand, a holiday-themed musical held in the Grand Music Hall. During the 2020 season, the show was re-imagined as Wonderland, and was held outdoors at the Hometown Square Stage. Other shows included The Holidays Bake Me Crazy, a show based on baking for the holidays. Holiday carolers named The MistleTones also walked around the park, singing holiday songs. One of the main features were the holiday lights. The light show Kalightoscope was held at Southwest Territory (also named Kalightoscope), on both the Chubasco mission building and Giant Drop. Elegance was another light show and was shown on the Columbia Carousel. Over 2,500,000 lights were strung up each season on park buildings and trees.

Attendance

Marriott operation 
Under operation of the Marriott Corporation, Marriott had expected 2.5 million visitors for the 1976 season. The Marriott Corporation had also expected 25,000 to 30,000 guests to visit daily. Due to the close radius of Chicago, Illinois, Rockford, Illinois and Milwaukee, Wisconsin, it was estimated that the park could draw 6 million to 7 million guests within the area. Marriott had closely reached its attendance goal of 2.5 million guests, with 2.35 million guests in 1976 and 2.4 million guests in the following year, 1977. With the rising attendance of the amusement park, it had also affected the attendance of neighboring amusement parks, including Old Chicago, in which guest numbers plummeted and later led to the closure of the shopping mall and amusement park in 1980 after the opening of Marriott's Great America.

Six Flags operation 
Under park policy, Six Flags Great America does not release attendance figures. However, the Themed Entertainment Association (TEA)  estimates attendance numbers for the amusement park.

Records and awards

Records 
Multiple Six Flags Great America attractions broke records and first-of-its-kinds when it opened in various categories. The first of these were American Eagle, opening as the tallest, fastest and longest racing wooden roller coaster in the world when it opened in 1981. The next one was Shockwave, opening in 1998, which, at the time, was the tallest and fastest roller coaster in the world, along with breaking the world record for most inversions on a roller coaster. Batman: The Ride opened in 1992 as the first inverted roller coaster in the world, which was manufactured by Bolliger & Mabillard.

Goliath claimed three Guinness World Records at its opening in 2014, as the steepest wooden roller coaster, longest drop on a wooden roller coaster and fastest wooden roller coaster in the world; retaining the latter two. Mardi Gras Hangover opened to the public on May 25, 2018, as the tallest fire ball attraction in the world.

Awards 
Some of Six Flags Great America's roller coasters have appeared on Amusement Today's annual Golden Ticket Awards multiple times, with the ride ranking the highest on the Golden Ticket Awards being Raging Bull placing 9th in 2005. For American Coaster Enthusiasts (ACE) awards, two roller coasters at Six Flags Great America have been designated as Coaster Landmark status, an award reserved for rides of significance to amusement parks. The first of these were Batman: The Ride, which was awarded the Coaster Landmark status on June 20, 2005, for its significance as the first inverted roller coaster to open to the public. The next award was given to Whizzer on August 10, 2012, for the parks preservation of the attraction. Additionally, Little Dipper was granted the ACE Coaster Classic award, an award for historic roller coasters that has been well maintained similarly to its original form.

The Fright Fest show Love at First Fright has won multiple International Association of Amusement Parks and Attractions (IAAPA) awards. In 2005, 2007 and 2008, the show won the IAAPA Big E! Award for "Best Overall Production: $25,000 or less." Additionally in 2008, the show Show Stoppin''' won the Big E! Award in the category "Best Overall Production: $25,001-$50,000." In 2010, 2013 and 2014, Love at First Fright won the IAAPA Brass Ring Awards in the category "Best Overall Production: $50,001-$100,000." On USA Today's Readers' Choice Awards, Goliath ranked number 4 in the category "Best Roller Coasters in the Country" in 2018 and Maxx Force ranked number 8 in the category "Best New Amusement Park Attraction" the following year.

 Incidents and accidents 

There were multiple instances of incidents and accidents taking place at Six Flags Great America. The U.S. Consumer Product Safety Commission (CPSC) had revealed that in two separate instances, a total of 31 guests had been injured on Whizzer in an investigation in 1980. These injuries were not reported to CPSC. During a private event rented out by U.S. Steel, Demon had stalled on a vertical loop on April 19, 1998, and had required an aerial fire apparatus to release stranded riders. A drive-by shooting occurred on August 14, 2022, injuring three people, which caused an evacuation of the entire park.

In popular culture
In the late 1970s, two TV specials were produced to feature the Marriott theme park in Gurnee, Illinois, both produced by WLS-TV (ABC 7 Chicago). To celebrate the opening of Marriott's Great America (now Six Flags), Celebration At Great America first aired on July 2, 1976, and again on August 21. The special starred Steve Edwards and Sandi Freeman of WLS-TV. Celebrity Guests included Mel Blanc as Bugs Bunny (and other Looney Tunes characters), Jo Anne Worley, Forrest Tucker, Jerry Stiller, Roger Perry and the Cast Members of Great America. Although in poor quality, the special can be found on YouTube.

Another special, titled You're Never Too Old, first aired on September 8, 1979, and again on April 26, 1980; hosted by actress Lisa Hartman. Originally, the special was planned to air on August 25, at 10:30 PM, before switching to the later date during primetime for unknown reasons. The special was met with good ratings, even beating out The 53rd Miss America pageant special that aired the same night. The special was uploaded to YouTube by The Museum of Classic Chicago Television.

In 1977, the park's circus show, Circus Fantastic, had one of its performances broadcast on Captain Kangaroo with Captain Kangaroo (Bob Keeshan) himself as the ringmaster and special guest star Bob Denver of Gilligan's Island fame. In 1994, Iron Wolf was featured in the movie Richie Rich and was showcased as a backyard coaster. On August 26, 2009, the park was featured on Dinner: Impossible where host Robert Irvine creates a meal for coaster enthusiasts to celebrate the 10th anniversary of Raging Bull. In a 2013 episode of Insane Coaster Wars, the park's B&M wing coaster X-Flight was featured as a contestant against other roller coasters around the world. In that same year, the park was featured in the Hindi movie Dhoom: 3.''

References
Notes

References

Further reading

External links

 
 
 

 
Amusement parks in Illinois
Great America
1976 establishments in Illinois
Gurnee, Illinois
Amusement parks opened in 1976